Cassandra Wilson (born December 4, 1955) is an American jazz singer, songwriter, and producer from Jackson, Mississippi. She is one of the most successful female Jazz singers and has been described by critic Gary Giddins as "a singer blessed with an unmistakable timbre and attack [who has] expanded the playing field" by incorporating blues, country, and folk music into her work. She has won numerous awards, including two Grammys, and was named "America's Best Singer" by Time magazine in 2001.

Early life and career
Cassandra Wilson is the third and youngest child of Herman Fowlkes, Jr., a guitarist, bassist, and music teacher; and Mary McDaniel, an elementary school teacher who earned her PhD in education. Her ancestry includes Fon, Yoruba, Irish and Welsh. Between her mother's love for Motown and her father's dedication to jazz, Wilson's parents sparked her early interest in music.

Wilson's earliest formal musical education consisted of classical lessons; she studied piano from the age of six to thirteen and played clarinet in the middle school concert and marching bands. When she was tired of this training, she asked her father to teach her the guitar. Instead, he gave her a lesson in self-reliance, suggesting she study Mel Bay method books. Wilson explored guitar on her own, developing what she has described as an "intuitive" approach. During this time she began writing her own songs, adopting a folk style. She also appeared in the musical theater productions, including The Wizard of Oz as Dorothy, crossing racial lines in a recently desegregated school system.

Wilson attended Millsaps College and Jackson State University. She graduated with a degree in mass communications. Outside of the classroom, she spent her nights working with R&B, funk, and pop cover bands, also singing in local coffeehouses. The Black Arts Music Society, founded by John Reese and Alvin Fielder, provided her with her first opportunities to perform bebop. In 2007, Wilson received her PhD in Arts from Millsaps College.

In 1981, she moved to New Orleans for a position as assistant public affairs director for the local television station, WDSU. She did not stay long. Working with mentors who included elder statesmen Earl Turbinton, Alvin Batiste, and Ellis Marsalis, Wilson found encouragement to seriously pursue jazz performance and moved to New York City the following year.

Musical association with M-Base
In New York, Wilson's focus turned towards improvisation. Heavily influenced by singers Abbey Lincoln and Betty Carter, she fine-tuned her vocal phrasing and scat while studying ear training with trombonist Grachan Moncur, III. Frequenting jam sessions under the tutelage of pianist Sadik Hakim, a Charlie Parker alumnus, she met alto saxophonist Steve Coleman, who encouraged her to look beyond the standard jazz repertoire in favor of developing original material. She would become the vocalist and one of the founding members of the M-Base collective in which Coleman was the leading figure, a stylistic outgrowth of the Association for the Advancement of Creative Musicians (AACM) and Black Artists Group (BAG) that re-imagined the grooves of funk and soul within the context of traditional and avant-garde jazz. Peter Watrous in an article for The New York Times states:

The M-Base group in Brooklyn, working with both jazz and pop forms, makes music that at first sounds like funk from the 1970s. Like the music played by Mr. Marsalis (and his brother Wynton) the music made by M-Base - Steve Coleman, with Greg Osby, Cassandra Wilson and Geri Allen – is, at its best, filled with subtle ideas working behind the mask of popular music. In Mr. Coleman's group a singer is supported by an electric bass, guitar, drums and electric keyboards, a shiny musical mix that has familiar rock and funk references; yet, because of all its rhythmic and metric manipulations, sounds new.

Although the voice – typically treated as the focal point of any arrangement in which it is included – was not an obvious choice for M-Base's complex textures or harmonically elaborated melodies, Wilson wove herself into the fabric of these settings with wordless improv and lyrics. She can be heard on Coleman's debut as a leader Motherland Pulse (1985), then as member of his Five Elements on On the Edge of Tomorrow (1986), World Expansion (1986), Sine Die (1987), and on M-Base Collective's sole recording as a large ensemble Anatomy of a Groove (1992).

At the same time, Wilson toured with avant-garde trio New Air featuring alto saxophonist Henry Threadgill and recorded Air Show No. 1 (1987) in Italy. A decade her senior and an AACM member, Threadgill has been lauded as a composer for his ability to transcend stylistic boundaries, a trait he and Wilson share.

Solo career

Like fellow M-Base artists, Wilson signed to the Munich-based, independent label JMT. She released her first recording as a leader Point of View in 1986. Like the majority of her JMT albums that followed, originals by Wilson in keeping with M-Base dominated these sessions; she would also record material by and co-written with Coleman, Jean-Paul Bourelly, and James Weidman as well as a few standards. Her throaty contralto gradually emerges over the course of these recordings, making its way to the foreground. She developed a remarkable ability to stretch and bend pitches, elongate syllables, manipulate tone and timbre from dusky to hollow.

While these recordings established her as a serious musician, Wilson received her first broad critical acclaim for the album of standards recorded in the middle of this period, Blue Skies (1988). Her signing with Blue Note Records in 1993 marked a crucial turning point in her career and major breakthrough to audiences beyond jazz with albums selling in the hundreds of thousands of copies.

Beginning with Blue Light 'Til Dawn (1993) her repertoire moved towards a broad synthesis of blues, pop, jazz, world music, and country. Although she continued to perform originals and standards, she adopted songs as diverse as Robert Johnson's "Come On in My Kitchen", Joni Mitchell's "Black Crow", The Monkees' "Last Train to Clarksville", and Hank Williams' "I'm So Lonesome I Could Cry".

Wilson's 1996 album New Moon Daughter won the Grammy for Best Jazz Vocal Performance. In 1997, she recorded and toured as a featured vocalist with Wynton Marsalis' Pulitzer Prize winning composition, Blood on the Fields.

Miles Davis was one of Wilson's greatest influences. In 1989, Wilson performed as the opening act for Davis at the JVC Jazz Festival in Chicago. In 1999 she produced Traveling Miles as a tribute to Davis. The album developed from a series of jazz concerts that she performed at Lincoln Center in November 1997 in Davis' honor, and includes three selections based on Davis' own compositions, from which Wilson adapted the original themes.

Personal life
Wilson was married to Anthony Wilson from 1981 to 1983.

She has a son, Jeris, born in the late 1980s. Her song "Out Loud (Jeris' Blues)" on the album She Who Weeps is dedicated to him. For many years she and her son lived in New York City's Sugar Hill, in an apartment that once belonged to Count Basie, Lena Horne and the boxer Joe Louis.

From 2000 to 2003 Wilson was married to actor Isaach de Bankolé, who directed her in the concert film Traveling Miles: Cassandra Wilson (2000).

Wilson and her mother are members of Alpha Kappa Alpha sorority.

Awards and honors
 1994–1996: Female Jazz Vocalist of the Year, Down Beat 
 1997: Grammy Award for Best Jazz Vocal Performance, New Moon Daughter
 1999: Miles Davis Prize, Montreal International Jazz Festival
 2001: "America's Best Singer", Time
 2003: Honorary doctorate in the Arts, Millsaps College
 2009: Grammy Award for Best Jazz Vocal Album, Loverly
 2010: Added to Mississippi Blues Trail
 2010: Best Vocal Album, NPR Music Jazz Critics Poll 2010, Silver Pony
 2011: Best Traditional Jazz Album, BET Soul Train Award, Silver Pony
 2015: Honorary doctorate in Fine Arts, The New School
 2015: Spirit of Ireland Award, Irish Arts Centre
 2020: Honorary doctorate in Music, Berklee College of Music

Discography

As leader
 Point of View (JMT, 1986)
 Days Aweigh (JMT, 1987)
 Blue Skies (JMT, 1988)
 Jumpworld (JMT, 1990)
 Live (JMT, 1991)
 She Who Weeps (JMT, 1991)
 Dance to the Drums Again (DIW, 1992)
 After the Beginning Again (JMT, 1992)
 Blue Light 'til Dawn (Blue Note, 1993)
 New Moon Daughter (Blue Note, 1995)
 Rendezvous with Jacky Terrasson (Blue Note, 1997)
 Traveling Miles (Blue Note, 1999)
 Belly of the Sun (Blue Note, 2002)
 Glamoured (Blue Note, 2003)
 Thunderbird (Blue Note, 2006)
 Loverly (Blue Note, 2008)
 Silver Pony (Blue Note, 2010)
 Another Country (eOne, 2012))
 Coming Forth by Day (Legacy, 2015)

Compilations
 Songbook (JMT, 1995)
 Sings Standards (Verve, 2002)
 Love Phases Dimensions: From the JMT Years (Edel, 2004)
 Closer to You: The Pop Side (Blue Note, 2009)
 5 Original Albums (Blue Note, 2018)

As guest
With Steve Coleman
 Motherland Pulse (JMT, 1985)
 On the Edge of Tomorrow (JMT, 1986)
 World Expansion (JMT, 1987)
 Sine Die (Pangaea, 1988)
 Rhythm People (The Resurrection of Creative Black Civilization) (RCA, 1990)
 Black Science (Novus, 1991)
 Drop Kick (Novus, 1992)
 The Ascension to Light (BMG France, 1999)

With Wynton Marsalis
 Blood on the Fields (Columbia, 1997)
 Reeltime (Sony, 1999)

With The Roots
 Do You Want More?!!!??! (DGC, 1994)
 Illadelph Halflife (DGC, 1996)

With others
 New Air, Air Show No. 1 (Black Saint, 1986)
 Don Byron, A Fine Line: Arias & Lieder (Blue Note, 2000)
 Terence Blanchard, Let's Get Lost (Sony, 2001)
 Terri Lyne Carrington, The Mosaic Project (Concord Jazz, 2011)
 Regina Carter, Rhythms of the Heart (Verve, 1999)
 Olu Dara, Neighborhoods (Atlantic, 2001)
 Kurt Elling, The Messenger (Blue Note, 1997)
 Robin Eubanks, Karma (JMT, 1991)
 Bill Frisell & Elvis Costello, The Sweetest Punch (Decca, 1999)
 Charlie Haden Quartet West, Sophisticated Ladies (EmArcy, 2010)
 Dave Holland, Dream of the Elders (ECM, 1995)
 Javon Jackson, A Look Within (Blue Note, 1996)
 Angelique Kidjo, Oremi (Island, 1998)
 M-Base Collective, Anatomy of a Groove (Columbia, 1992)
 David Murray Black Saint Quartet, Sacred Ground (Justin Time, 2007)
 Meshell Ndegeocello, The Spirit Music Jamia: Dance of the Infidel (Shanachie, 2005)
 Greg Osby, Season of Renewal (JMT, 1990)
 Courtney Pine, Modern Day Jazz Stories (Antilles, 1995)
 David Sanchez, Street Scenes (Columbia, 1996)
 Steve Turre, Steve Turre (Verve, 1997)
 Luther Vandross, I Know (EMI, 1998)
 Count Basie Orchestra, Ella 100: Live at the Apollo! (Concord, 2020)

References

External links
 
 
 
 Cassandra Wilson at Blue Note Records
 Cassandra Wilson at Montreal International Jazz Festival

American blues singers
American jazz singers
1955 births
Living people
American contraltos
American women jazz singers
American jazz songwriters
African-American women singer-songwriters
African-American jazz musicians
Grammy Award winners
Mississippi Blues Trail
Yoruba women musicians
Jackson State University alumni
Millsaps College alumni
American people of Beninese descent
American people of Irish descent
American people of Welsh descent
Fon people
Musicians from Jackson, Mississippi
Singer-songwriters from Mississippi
20th-century American singers
21st-century American singers
20th-century American musicians
21st-century American composers
20th-century American women singers
21st-century American women singers
Jazz musicians from Mississippi
JMT Records artists
Blue Note Records artists
21st-century women composers
20th-century African-American women
21st-century African-American women singers